T in the Park 2011 was a three-day music festival which took place from 8–10 July 2011 in Balado, Scotland, The total crowd for this gig was 59,674. The eighteenth event to take place.  The full line up was revealed in February 2011: Arctic Monkeys, Coldplay, Beyoncé and Foo Fighters were revealed as the headliners. Blink-182 were confirmed but cancelled as they were unable to produce their new album in time for their European tour. Christmas 'early bird' tickets were released on 3 December 2010, selling out in under 24 hours. A previous 'early bird' batch was released on 15 July.

Tickets
Similar to previous years, early-bird tickets were released within days of the conclusion of the 2010 event, on 15 July 2010. Tickets remained on sale until the following Sunday. A further 'Christmas sale' took place from 3 December 2010, with tickets made available at 2010 festival ticket prices. It was confirmed on 3 December 2010 that early-bird tickets had sold out. The final batch of tickets went on sale on Friday 25 February 2011 and sold out in under an hour.

Line-up
The line-up was billed to include 180 artists across eleven stages.

References

2011 in Scotland
T in the Park
2011 in British music
July 2011 events in the United Kingdom
2011 music festivals